Desio is a railway station in Italy. Located on the Milan–Chiasso railway, it serves the town of Desio.

Services
Desio is served by lines S9 and S11 of the Milan suburban railway network, operated by the Lombard railway company Trenord.

See also
 Milan suburban railway network

References

External links

Railway stations in Lombardy
Milan S Lines stations
Railway stations opened in 1849
1849 establishments in the Austrian Empire
Railway stations in Italy opened in 1849